Philenoptera violacea known also as apple leaf or rain tree, IsiNdebele: Ichithamuzi, Idungamuzi, Iphanda) is a plant species in the legume family (Fabaceae).

Habitat
It is found in the DRC, Tanzania, Zambia, northern Namibia, Zimbabwe, South Africa, Eswatini and Okavango Delta, Botswana.

Status
It is a protected tree in South Africa.

References

External links
 

Millettieae
Protected trees of South Africa
Flora of Namibia
Flora of Tanzania
Flora of Zimbabwe
Flora of Zambia
Trees of the Democratic Republic of the Congo